Population equivalent (PE) or unit per capita loading, or equivalent person (EP), is a parameter for characterizing industrial wastewaters. It essentially compares the polluting potential of an industry (in terms of biodegradable organic matter) with a population (or certain number of people), which would produce the same polluting load. In other words, it is the number expressing the ratio of the sum of the pollution load produced during 24 hours by industrial facilities and services to the individual pollution load in household sewage produced by one person in the same time. This refers to the amount of oxygen-demanding substances in wastewater which will consume oxygen as it bio-degrades, usually as a result of bacterial activity.

Equation and base value 
A value frequently used in the international literature for PE, which was based on a German publication, is 54 gram of BOD (Biochemical oxygen demand) per person (or per capita or per inhabitant) per day. This has been adopted by many countries for design purposes but other values are also in use. For example, a commonly used definition used in Europe is: 1 PE equates to 60 gram of BOD per person per day, and it also equals 200 liters of sewage per day. In the United States, a figure of 80 grams BOD per day is normally used.

If the base value is taken as 60 grams of BOD per person per day, then the equation to calculate PE from an industrial wastewater is:

Population equivalents for industrial wastewaters 
{| class="wikitable sortable" border="1"
|+ BOD population equivalents of wastewater from some industries
|-
! Type
! Activity
!Unit of production
! BOD PE
[inhab/(unit/d)]
|-
| Food
| Canning (fruit/vegetables) 
|1 ton processed
| 500 
|-
||
| Pea processing
|1 ton processed
| 85-400
|-
||
| Tomato
|1 ton processed
| 50-185
|-
||
| Carrot
|1 ton processed
| 160-390
|-
||
| Potato
|1 ton processed
| 215-545
|-
||
| Citrus fruit
|1 ton processed
| 55
|-
||
| Chicken meat
|1 ton processed
| 70-1600
|-
||
| Beef
|1 ton processed
| 20-600
|-
||
| Fish
|1 ton processed
| 300-2300
|-
||
| Sweets/candies
|1 ton produced
| 40-150
|-
||
| Sugar cane
|1 ton produced
| 50
|-
||
| Dairy (without cheese)
|1000 L milk
| 20-100
|-
||
| Dairy (with cheese)
|1000 L milk
| 100-800
|-
||
| Margarine
|1 ton produced
| 500
|-
||
| Slaughter house
|1 cow / 2.5 pigs
| 10-100
|-
||
| Yeast production
|1 ton produced
| 21000
|-
| Confined animals breeding
| Pigs
|live t.d
| 35-100
|-
||
| Dairy cattle (milking room)
|live t.d
| 1-2
|-
||
| Cattle
|live t.d
| 65-150
|-
||
| Horses
|live t.d
| 65-150
|-
||
| Poultry
|live t.d
| 15-20
|-
| Sugar-alcohol
| Alcohol distillation
|1 ton cane processed
| 4000
|-
| Drinks
| Brewery
|1 m3 produced
| 150-350
|-
||
| Soft drinks
|1 m3 produced
| 50-100
|-
||
| Wine
|1 m3 produced
| 5
|-
| Textiles
| Cotton
|1 ton produced
| 2800
|-
||
| Wool
|1 ton produced
| 5600
|-
||
| Rayon
|1 ton produced
| 550
|-
||
| Nylon
|1 ton produced
| 800
|-
||
| Polyester
|1 ton produced
| 3700
|-
||
| Wool washing
|1 ton produced
| 2000-4500
|-
||
| Dyeing
|1 ton produced
| 2000-3500
|-
||
| Textile bleaching
|1 ton produced
| 250-350
|-
| Leather and tanneries
| Tanning
|1 ton hide processed
| 1000-3500
|-
||
| Shoes
|1000 pairs produced
| 300
|-
| Pulp and paper
| Pulp
|1 ton produced
| 600
|-
||
| Paper
|1 ton produced
| 100-300
|-
||
| Pulp and paper integrated
|1 ton produced
| 1000-10000
|-
| Chemical industrial
| Paint
|1 employee
| 20
|-
||
| Soap
|1 ton produced
| 1000
|-
||
| Petroleum refinery
|1 barrel (117 L)
| 1
|-
||
| PVC
|1 ton produced
| 200
|-
| Steelworks
| Foundry
|1 ton pig iron produced
| 12-30
|-
||
| Lamination
|1 ton produced
| 8-50
|}

See also
Sewage treatment

References

Environmental science
Waste treatment technology
Sewerage
Equivalent units